Hot Streak is an Australian afternoon game show aired on the Seven Network in 1998, hosted by James O'Neil.
This show was based on the short-lived 1986 America format called Bruce Forsyth's Hot Streak, Two teams of five contestants (one consisting of men, the other, of women) compete in a battle of the sexes game of word association for a chance to win up to $50,000.

On the Australian Hot Streak, each correct transition down the line in the first two rounds scored $5, while each transition in the third round scored $10. On later episodes, teams scored $5 per transition in the first three rounds and $15 apiece in the fourth round.

The winning team played the same bonus game as the American version except that each correct word mentioned on the first subject would be worth the same amount won earlier. The amount won in round one would be multiplied by the number of correct words mentioned in part two. The team's winnings from part two would be multiplied by five if the team succeeded in part three. Five-time championship teams played only one subject for a grand total of $50,000.

Hot Streak was axed in November 1998 citing lower-than-expected ratings after its first year on air.

References

External links
  (Australia)

Seven Network original programming
1990s Australian game shows
1998 Australian television series debuts
1998 Australian television series endings
English-language television shows
Television series by Reg Grundy Productions
Television shows set in New South Wales